L'ultimo gattopardo: Ritratto di Goffredo Lombardo (translated: "The last leopard: Portrait of Goffredo Lombardo") is a 2010 Italian documentary film directed by Giuseppe Tornatore about the producer and Titanus president Goffredo Lombardo.

It premiered out of competition at the 67th edition of the Venice Film Festival. It was awarded a special Nastro d'Argento at the 2011 Silver Ribbon Awards ceremony.

References

External links  

2010 documentary films
2010 films
Italian documentary films
Films directed by Giuseppe Tornatore
Documentary films about film directors and producers
2010s Italian-language films